Antonia is a plant genus in the family Loganiaceae.

References

External links

Loganiaceae
Gentianales genera